The Sony Xperia ZL (C650x), marketed as Sony Xperia ZQ in Brazil, is a touchscreen enabled, full HD Android smartphone designed, developed, and marketed by Sony Mobile. The ZL was announced by Sony at CES 2013. The device was launched with Android 4.1 Jelly Bean. This is among a few phones with HDR video taking capability. This phone comes with a full HD display (1920x1080) with a ppi of approximately 443.

The Xperia ZL is a compact and cheaper variant of the Sony Xperia Z, and compromises water and dust proofing, as well as design language for a thinner frame. 

Unlike the Xperia Z, it is also equipped with an infrared blaster and a dedicated camera button.

Features

 5” 1080 x 1920p full HD Reality Display with Mobile BRAVIA Engine 2
 13MP Fast Capture camera with Exmor RS for mobile, the first image sensor with HDR video for smartphones
 1.5 GHz quad-core Qualcomm Snapdragon S4 Pro processor
 2GB RAM
 Compact design – display is 75% of front panel
 One-touch functions
 IR blaster – remote support for Sony BRAVIA televisions and other consumer electronics
 4G supported
 TFT capacitive touch screen
 Available in three colors, black, white and red
 Current Android 5.1.1 (further support not available officially)
 Size 131.6 x 69.3 x 9.8 mm (5.18 x 2.73 x 0.39 in)
 Weight 151 g (5.33 oz)

See also
 Sony Xperia Z series

References

External links
 Official website

Android (operating system) devices
Sony smartphones
Mobile phones introduced in 2013
Discontinued smartphones
Mobile phones with user-replaceable battery
Mobile phones with infrared transmitter